Prophetic dance is a ritual dance in which the purpose is to obtain a communication from or to God (gods)  spirits in order to receive a favorable response (rain and good harvests, for example). Is also present in a section of the modern charismatic movement of Christianity, in which the term is fixed.

See also
 Sacred dance
 Worship dance

References

Ritual dances
Sacred dance